Christianity is a minority in Qinghai province of the People's Republic of China. Christianity in Xining is a major proportion of Christianity in Qinghai. An Apostolic Prefecture of Xining of the Roman Catholic Church exists. Most Christians in the province are Protestants.
Most Protestants are house church Christians. 
Xining has Qinghai Provincial Protestant Christian Training Centre. The number of members of the major church in the capital of the province increased fromn 800 in 2992 to 7000 in 1997. Most Eastern Champa are not Christians. 

The province had 400 Christians in the 1940s. Gansu is an area with persecution of Christians. Many Christians were sent to internal exile in Qinghai. The churches in the province include Datong County Church, 
Guide County Church, Huangyuan County Church and 
Longyang Gorge Church. Amity Foundation distributed relief after the major earthquake.

See also 
 Mentuhui
 Christianity in Qinghai's neighbouring provinces
 Christianity in Sichuan
 Christianity in Tibet
 Christianity in Xinjiang

References

Religion in Qinghai
Christianity in China by location